Malladi Subbamma (2 August 1924 – 15 May 2014) born in Pothardhakam in Repella of Guntur district. She was a feminist writer, rationalist, and editor of Stree Swetcha. She worked for the upliftment of women by focusing on their education. She became a prominent figure in united Andhra Pradesh, after spearheading the Anti-liquor movement. The movement became a huge success and a prohibition on the sale of alcohol in the state was implemented in 1994. As the head of the Institute of Advancement of Women, she conducted many study camps to educate women. She was an avid proponent of humanism, for that she traveled throughout the country to propagate the same. In 2012, she sold her belongings and donated the proceeds to the building dedicated for Center for Women's Studies at University of Hyderabad on International Women's Day. She has authored about 110 books and 500 articles, mainly on Women's empowerment other women's issues.

Literary works
Among many books and articles she has authored, the following are some of her prominent works:
 Bānisā kādu dēvatā kādu in Telugu
 Ō mahiḷā! munduku sāgipō in Telugu
 Samasyalu, saṃskaraṇalu in Telugu
 Mahiḷā abhyudayamu in Telugu
 Taratarāla strīla parājaya gādha in Telugu
 Āndhrapradēślō mahiḷōdyamaṃ, mahiḷā saṅghālu, 1860-1983 in Telugu
 Pātivratyaṃ nuṇḍi pheminijaṃ dākā : ātmakadha in Telugu
 Women and Social Reform
 Women, Tradition and Culture
 The Visnumahapuranam
 Status of Indian Women
 Manava Hakkulu-Mahilala Hakkulu in Telugu
 Women in Changing Society

References

Telugu-language writers
Indian feminist writers
Indian humanists
Women's empowerment
People from Guntur district